Vesec is the 25th of the 35 districts of the city of Liberec, Czech Republic. Located in the south of Liberec, it was used for the 2009 Nordic World Ski Championship for the cross-country skiing events, after a temporary course was especially built.

History 
The first mention of Vesec was in the year 1412.

References
 :cs:Vesec (Liberec)

Neighbourhoods in the Czech Republic
Liberec